General FitzClarence may refer to:

Charles FitzClarence (1865–1914), British Army brigadier general
Lord Frederick FitzClarence (1799–1854), British Army lieutenant general
George FitzClarence, 1st Earl of Munster (1794–1842), British Army major general